Anson High School may refer to:

In the United States 
 Anson High School (North Carolina), Wadesboro, North Carolina
 Anson High School (Texas), Anson, Texas